The Clermont colonial by-election, 1868 was a by-election held on 22 June 1868 in the electoral district of Clermont for the Queensland Legislative Assembly.

History
On 11 May 1868, Charles Fitzsimmons, the member for Clermont, resigned. John Scott won the resulting by-election on 22 June 1868.

See also
 Members of the Queensland Legislative Assembly, 1867–1868

References

1868 elections in Australia
Queensland state by-elections
1860s in Queensland